Kalfaköy can refer to the following villages in Turkey:

 Kalfaköy, Aydın
 Kalfaköy, Susurluk